Liu Yandong (is a retired Chinese politician. She recently served as the Vice Premier of the People's Republic of China, and was a member of the Politburo of the Chinese Communist Party from 2007 to 2017, a State Councilor between 2007 and 2012, and headed the United Front Work Department of the Communist Party between 2002 and 2007.

A graduate of Tsinghua University, Liu's career has long been associated with her fellow alumnus and Communist Youth League colleague Hu Jintao. As such Chinese-language media has sometimes labelled Liu as part of the so-called "Tuanpai", or "Youth League clique". After the retirement of Wu Yi, Liu has been highest-ranked female political figure in China, and one of only three women with a seat on the Politburo, the others being retired Vice Premier Wu Yi and current second Vice Premier Sun Chunlan.

Biography

Early career
Liu Yandong was born in Nantong County, Jiangsu, in what was then Republic of China. Her father Liu Ruilong was one of the founders of the 14th Army of the Reds, an early Communist revolutionary militia force.  As her father was of a revolutionary background, she has been classified by some analysts as a princeling.  Liu entered the prestigious Tsinghua University in 1964, weathered the Cultural Revolution, and graduated in 1970 with a degree in chemistry.  While in college, Liu was a part-time political instructor.

Shortly after graduation, Liu began work at a chemical production plant in Tangshan, an industrial city in northeastern China, in what was likely an assignment by the state. In 1980, she was transferred to work for the party organization in Beijing, in 1981 she was made deputy Party Secretary of Chaoyang District. In 1982, Liu began working for the Communist Youth League, where she worked with contemporaries Wang Zhaoguo, Hu Jintao, and Song Defu. She worked at the Youth League for nine years. During this time she served as Chairwoman of the All-China Youth Federation.

In March 1991, she began working at the United Front Work Department as its deputy secretary-general. The mandate of the United Front is essentially to keep non-Communist political and civic organizations in line with the overarching ideologies of the Communist Party. During her term at the department, she gained on-the-job master's and doctorate degrees at Renmin University and Jilin University.

Politburo
Between 2002 and 2007, she served as the head of the United Front Work Department. In March 2002 she was also elected Vice Chair of the Chinese People's Political Consultative Conference. Having long been an ally of Party General Secretary Hu Jintao and ascended from the ranks of the Communist Youth League, she entered the 17th Politburo of the Chinese Communist Party in 2007. Widely speculated to become Vice-Premier in an upcoming leadership reshuffle, by 2007, Liu was the sole woman with a seat on the Politburo and the highest ranked female politician in China. At the 2008 National People's Congress she was elected State Councilor, and was not elected as a Vice-Premier. She was also deputy chair of the Beijing Organizing Committee for the Olympic Games.

At the 18th National Congress of the Chinese Communist Party in 2012, she was elected to the 18th Politburo of the Chinese Communist Party.  She became the first woman since Deng Yingchao to serve consecutive terms on the Politburo.  A few months later, at the first plenary session of the 12th National People's Congress in 2013, she was also appointed Vice Premier, second in rank, overseeing the broad portfolios of health, education, and sports.  Since 2013, Liu has been the leader of the Leading Group for Health Care Reform.

Personal life
Liu is married. On April 13, 2009, Stony Brook University conferred upon Madame Liu Yandong an Honorary Doctor of Laws.

See also
 Tsinghua clique

References

External links 
  Profile of Liu Yandong, Xinhua News Agency.
 Biography Xinhua (November 2012)

Living people
1945 births
Politicians from Nantong
People's Republic of China politicians from Jiangsu
Chinese Communist Party politicians from Jiangsu
Vice Premiers of the People's Republic of China
Vice Chairpersons of the National Committee of the Chinese People's Political Consultative Conference
Members of the 18th Politburo of the Chinese Communist Party
Tsinghua University alumni
Chemists from Jiangsu
Women state councillors of China
Members of the 17th Politburo of the Chinese Communist Party
21st-century Chinese women politicians
21st-century Chinese politicians